Hedrick is an American surname, and may refer to:

 Brandon Hedrick (1979–2006), convicted murderer executed by Virginia
 Chad Hedrick (born 1977), American inline speed skater and ice speed skater
 Christopher Hedrick (born 1962), Entrepreneur and international development leader
 Clinton M. Hedrick (1918–1945), United States Army soldier and recipient of the Medal of Honor
 E. H. Hedrick (1894–1954), American Democratic politician from West Virginia
 Earle Raymond Hedrick (1876–1943), American mathematician and a vice-president of the University of California
 Granville Hedrick (1814–1881), leader in the Latter Day Saint movement
 J. Karl Hedrick (1944–2017), American controls researcher
 Larry Hedrick (born 1940), North Carolina-born businessman and former NASCAR team owner
 Philip Hedrick (born 1942), American population geneticist and conservation biologist
 Todd Hedrick (born 1978), American philosopher
 Ulysses Prentiss Hedrick (1870–1951), American botanist and horticulturist
 Wally Hedrick (1928–2003), American artist in the 1950s California counterculture
 Wilbur Olin Hedrick (1868–1954), American economist 
 Wyatt C. Hedrick (1888–1964), American architect, engineer, and developer

See also 
 Hedrick (disambiguation)